Christopher Makepeace (born April 22, 1964) is a Canadian former actor, known for his starring roles in the coming-of-age film My Bodyguard (1980) and comedy horror Vamp (1986), and supporting roles in the screwball comedy Meatballs (1979) and the dystopian sci-fi film The Last Chase (1981), during his teen and young adult years.

Life and career 
Makepeace was born in Montreal, Quebec, the son of Doreen and Harry Makepeace. His older brother, Tony Makepeace, is a Canadian photographer.

He began his acting career in a 1974 Canadian television special, The Ottawa Valley. His next role was in a 1979 Canadian comedy, Meatballs, in which he starred opposite Bill Murray, portrayed  as a shy, loner teen attendee of a summer camp, who has trouble fitting in. The movie was a hit, grossing more than $43 million at the box office, and Makepeace received good notices for his work in the film. He was then cast in the lead role in the Fox film, My Bodyguard, released in July 1980 to positive reviews, earning $22.5 million domestically. In his review of the film, critic Roger Ebert said that Makepeace's performance resulted in "one of the most engaging teenage characters I've seen in the movies in a long time." Makepeace also starred opposite Lee Majors and Burgess Meredith in the 1981 film The Last Chase. Makepeace's subsequent roles included appearances in made-for-television films and a few more feature films, including Mazes and Monsters with Tom Hanks, The Falcon and the Snowman in 1985 and 1986's Vamp. 

In 1981, Makepeace recorded spoken dialogue for the Kiss album Music from "The Elder" with Producer Bob Ezrin, but it was not used in the final mix; plans to turn the album into a feature film never materialized.

He has not appeared in any films since 2001, moving instead behind the camera as an assistant director.

Filmography

Film and television credits

Awards

References

External links 
 
 

1964 births
Anglophone Quebec people 
Canadian male film actors
Canadian male television actors
Living people
Male actors from Montreal